In mathematics, Darboux's theorem is a theorem in real analysis, named after Jean Gaston Darboux. It states that every function that results from the differentiation of another function has the intermediate value property: the image of an interval is also an interval.

When ƒ is continuously differentiable (ƒ in C1([a,b])), this is a consequence of the intermediate value theorem. But even when ƒ′ is not continuous, Darboux's theorem places a severe restriction on what it can be.

Darboux's theorem
Let  be a closed interval,  be a real-valued differentiable function.

Proofs
Proof 1. The first proof is based on the extreme value theorem.

Let   such that .

(If it did, then  for all , which implies .)

Therefore,  must attain its maximum value at some point . Hence, by Fermat's theorem, i.e. .

Proof 2. The second proof is based on combining the mean value theorem and the intermediate value theorem.

Define .

Thus, for  we have .

Furthermore,  when  and  when ; therefore, from the Intermediate Value Theorem, if  then, there exists  such that .
Let's fix .

From the Mean Value Theorem, there exists a point  such that .
Hence, .

Darboux function
A Darboux function is a real-valued function ƒ which has the "intermediate value property": for any two values a and b in the domain of ƒ, and any y between ƒ(a) and ƒ(b), there is some c between a and b with ƒ(c) = y.  By the intermediate value theorem, every continuous function on a real interval is a Darboux function. Darboux's contribution was to show that there are discontinuous Darboux functions.

Every discontinuity of a Darboux function is essential, that is, at any point of discontinuity, at least one of the left hand and right hand limits does not exist.

An example of a Darboux function that is discontinuous at one point is the topologist's sine curve function:

By Darboux's theorem, the derivative of any differentiable function is a Darboux function. In particular, the derivative of the function  is a Darboux function even though it is not continuous at one point.

An example of a Darboux function that is nowhere continuous is the Conway base 13 function.

Darboux functions are a quite general class of functions. It turns out that any real-valued function ƒ on the real line can be written as the sum of two Darboux functions. This implies in particular that the class of Darboux functions is not closed under addition.

A strongly Darboux function is one for which the image of every (non-empty) open interval is the whole real line.  The Conway base 13 function is again an example.

Notes

External links
 
 

Theorems in calculus
Theory of continuous functions
Theorems in real analysis
Articles containing proofs